Destiny is a 1977 war film directed by Yevgeny Matveyev and starring Matveyev, Olga Ostroumova, Yury Yakovlev, screen adaptation of Pyotr Proskurin's second book, the novel  Earthy Love. This film had 57,8 million spectators in 1978. Evgeniy Matveyev  was honored with State Prize of the USSR for  Destiny in 1978.

Plot
The love story of married chairman of kolkhoz Zakhar Deryugin to young woman Mannya Polivanova during a 
harvest in Russian village of 30th. During World War II Zakhar Deryugin is mobilized and going to front. While the  battles he is taken as a  prisoner and makes runaway. Bryukhanov's wife  Katya appears in occupation. Not having achieved Katya's  consent to cooperation, Germans, having slandered, secretly execute her. Senior son of Deryugin's perishes from a fascist bullet. His mother Evfrosinya burns sleeping fascists in her own  house. In return Germans prepare for the retaliatory action, but Zakhar  alone with  guerrillas  rush into village and rescue its inhabitants.

Main cast
Yevgeny Matveyev   as	Zakhar Deriugin
Olga Ostroumova as        Manya
Zinaida Kiriyenko	as     Efrosinya
Yury Yakovlev	as     Tikhon
Valeriya Zaklunna as    Katerina
 Vadim Spiridonov as Fyodor Makashin
Irina Skobtseva	as     Elizaveta
Viktor Khokhryakov	as     Chubarov
Vladimir Samoilov	as Rodion Anisimov	
Stanislav Chekan  as  Pavel Semyonovich Koshev 
 Georgi Yumatov as Pekarev, guerrillas
 Algimantas Masiulis as Sturmbannführer Zolding

References

External links

 Destiny. Film.Peoples 
Destiny. Kino-teatr.ru 

1977 films
1970s war drama films
Soviet war drama films
Russian war drama films
Mosfilm films
1970s Russian-language films
1977 drama films
Russian World War II films
Soviet World War II films